TWG may refer to:

Trans-World Group, association of commodities traders controlling stakes in most of Russia's aluminum smelters
TWG Tea, Singaporean tea brand
The Wireless Group, broadcasting and new media company based in Belfast, Northern Ireland
The Wollongong Group, American software company
The World Games, a recurrant multi-sport event that complements the Olympics
Tereweng language (ISO 639-3: twg), a language of Papua New Guinea

See also

 
 WG (disambiguation)